"When She Loved Me" is a song written by American musician Randy Newman and recorded by Canadian singer Sarah McLachlan for Pixar's animated film Toy Story 2 (1999). The song reveals the backstory of Jessie, a toy cowgirl, as she reflects upon her defunct relationship with her original owner, by whom she was outgrown. Heard in the film during a flashback sequence, the filmmakers decided to incorporate a song into the montage during which Jessie details her backstory to Woody after multiple attempts to show the character relaying her experience verbally proved unsuccessful.

Newman initially felt that the song was inappropriate, doubting that young children would be interested in it; he changed his mind after screen tests showed optimistic results. The song was offered to McLachlan after Newman and the filmmakers agreed that the ballad was more appropriate for a female artist. Despite some hesitation from her management, McLachlan greatly enjoyed the ballad and agreed to record it upon hearing Newman's demo, finding herself drawn towards its melancholy nature. Musically, "When She Loved Me" is an emotional pop ballad backed by simple piano accompaniment. Various interpretations of the song's lyrics and themes have been offered; while written primarily about the pain felt upon losing a platonic friend, "When She Loved Me" has also been interpreted as a love song, while some music journalists consider the track to be a metaphor for children inevitably growing up and becoming independent from their parents.

"When She Loved Me" has garnered critical acclaim from film and music critics, who found the song to be both moving and heartbreaking, praising Newman's songwriting and McLachlan's vocal performance. "When She Loved Me" won a Grammy Award for Best Song Written for a Motion Picture, Television or Other Visual Media. The song was nominated for Golden Globe and Academy Awards for Best Original Song but lost both to "You'll Be in My Heart" from Disney's Tarzan (1999). "When She Loved Me" has since earned a reputation as one of the saddest sequences in both Pixar and Disney films, as well as one of the saddest film songs ever written. The song has been covered by several artists, including Steve Tyrell, Bridgit Mendler and the musical group Steps.

Writing and recording 

Beginning with Toy Story (1995), director John Lasseter had long decided that Pixar films would not be musicals in which characters spontaneously perform songs, but agreed that musician Randy Newman should write original songs for certain moments during the story, most of which he would sing himself. Originally, the filmmakers had considered having Jessie, a toy cowgirl, simply explain her backstory verbally; this concept was re-visited several times until the idea of re-working her thoughts into a song called "When She Loved Me" was suggested. Lasseter identified the addition of the song as the film's most significant production change. Newman, however, doubted that "When She Loved Me" would work, initially thinking that the filmmakers were mistaken by incorporating it into the film, due to the song essentially being about the difference between feeling loved and unloved. The songwriter called the ballad a risk due to the studio's history of fearing slowing down films too much and losing the audience's interest in the process. Newman continued to doubt that children would be able to sit through the song until he observed their behavior during an initial screening. He was ultimately surprised to find that even the youngest children in the audience remained attentive during the song despite its slow tempo and mature, emotional themes. Newman joked that the song was not "the first time [Pixar] knew better than I did", explaining, "I wrote something that must have worked or the kids would have been running up the aisle." Lasseter admitted that he is most proud of the way in which "When She Loved Me" was used in the film.

Alongside "Woody's Roundup", "When She Loved Me" was one of two new songs Newman wrote for the film. Originally entitled "Jessie's Song", Newman's demo is shorter with slightly different lyrics from the final version. He considers "When She Loved Me" to be among his favorite film compositions, and found the assignment easier than writing music for studio albums because the filmmakers were "clear what they want to have said", as opposed to "pulling something out of the air". Pixar explained that his assignment was to write a song "about [Jessie's] life and her disappointment with her relationship with her owner, and they grew up", with the songwriter only knowing the length required for the song and that it was intended for a female voice. Although Newman maintains that the song is almost exclusively about the relationship between a doll and her estranged owner, he admitted that "inevitably some of my own experience seeps in there". Unlike the songs he had written for Toy Story, Newman does not sing "When She Loved Me" himself; the filmmakers insisted that the ballad be performed by a female singer, a decision by which the songwriter was not offended, and recruited Canadian singer-songwriter Sarah McLachlan, of whom Lasseter had been "a tremendous fan". Newman compared writing for a singing voice like McLachlan's as opposed to himself to "writing for a different instrument", explaining, "I have a blues-oriented voice ... She has a different kind of contralto, or whatever the hell she has. Soprano. It's a voice that can hold notes, so I can write with that in mind."

Still a relatively new artist at the time, McLachlan claims that, when she was first sent the song, her management warned her that she might not like it. However, she ultimately began crying almost immediately upon hearing "When She Loved Me" for the first time, describing herself as "a sucker" for sad, melancholy songs. Newman's performance on the demo reminded McLachlan of "Bein' Green", a song originally performed by American puppeteer Jim Henson as the Muppet Kermit the Frog. Despite not knowing how children would react to the song, McLachlan felt confident that mothers would be incredibly moved by it. McLachlan found the process of recording a song for an animated film to be different than what she had grown accustomed to as a recording artist owing to the number of people involved in the project recording with Newman. Newman and McLachlan recorded approximately 17 takes of the song before finally deciding upon a few with which they were satisfied. Newman and McLachlan produced the song together, with Newman arranging and orchestrating. Both Newman's piano accompaniment and McLachlan's vocals were recorded by producer Greg Reely at The Warehouse Studio in Vancouver, British Columbia.

Context and use in Toy Story 2 
Serving as a "haunting soundtrack to Jesse's[sic] tale of abandonment", "When She Loved Me" is Toy Story 2's main song, and plays over a montage showing of Jessie and her former owner Emily. Heard approximately midway through the film, the song narrates a flashback during which Jessie recalls the moment she is abandoned by Emily, reflecting upon their once-loving relationship and the good times they shared until Jessie is gradually outgrown and ultimately donated to charity in a cardboard box. The montage was animated by Tasha Wedeen. According to co-director Ash Brannon, the scene is "an example of perfect animation casting". In addition to the sequel having more female animators than Toy Story, Brannon found it helpful that a woman animated Jessie, elaborating, "Tasha animated ["When She Loved Me"] and I don't think anybody could have done her better." Specific lighting effects and filters were used throughout the sequence to complement its mood, including sun-kissed lighting.

Earlier in the film, Woody is stolen from a yard sale by Al McWhiggin, a toy collector, in order to complete his collection of vintage Woody's Roundup toys. A Japanese toy museum is willing to purchase Woody and the rest of the retired Woody's Roundup cast for a lucrative sum, each of whom have become collector's items since the show's cancellation. Most of the toys long to travel to the museum in order to avoid spending their remaining lives in storage, but Woody is hesitant, and the museum will only accept the toys as a complete set. Jessie is particularly adamant that it would be best to relocate to the museum. While Woody explains that he is eager to return home to his rightful owner Andy, preferring to be loved while risking damage and abandonment as opposed to being immortalized in a museum, Jessie finally reveals that she herself once had an owner much like Andy by whom she was treasured, before ultimately being discarded. Before the song begins, Woody tells Jessie about his relationship with Andy, which prompts her to share her own embittered experience with Emily, the only person she had ever truly cared about. Seated on a window sill, Jessie perfectly interprets Woody's feelings for Andy: "when [Andy] plays with you it's like, even though you're not moving, you feel like you're alive, 'cos that's how he sees you", Describing Emily as her "whole world", Jessie proceeds to explain to Woody both the joys and tragedies associated with being loved by a child, having once been Emily's favorite toy before her interests change as she grows older, turning towards music and makeup instead, and increasingly neglecting Jessie in the process, including forgetting her underneath her bed. Emily's cowgirl-themed possessions are gradually replaced with makeup and music albums. Before the scene ends, it offers Jessie (and audiences) a moment of false hope by showing the doll being rediscovered, retrieved from underneath Emily's bed and held as though she is about to be played with once again, only to be placed inside a cardboard box and left on the side of a road to be donated to charity. Jessie believes all toys eventually "outlive their usefulness"; to her, the idea of relocating to Japan "means that she will provide pleasure again and have some purpose in life." Sky TV described the scene as "Jessie's wistful trip down Memory Lane". The song also develops Jessie and Woody's relationship; Jessie finds the courage to tell Woody her story, explaining her apprehension towards the idea of having an owner, while Woody becomes a compassionate listener by learning about how she had become a collectible in the first place. Jessie's sadness is used "as the anchor to keep Woody in place", making him torn between which decision to make upon listening to Jessie's story. Later in the film, Jessie must make a choice of her own to either forsake immortality in favor of being loved by a child once again. BBC Online summarized the song's use in the film as "girl meets toy, girl loves toy, girl grows up, toy is left out for recycling."

Slant Magazine's Aaron Cutler identified "When She Loved Me" as one of the "few moments of melancholia" amidst an otherwise "sweet and light" film. Describing the song as "a fundamental Disney moment", Lasseter himself explained, "It's like Walt [Disney] once said, for every laugh there should be a tear and for every tear a laugh." During this song, the audience learns about the origins of Jessie's "deep abandonment issues". Paste contributor Tim Grierson expressed that the toy "isn't just singing ... she's expressing a very human fear of abandonment that's backed up by decades of [Randy] Newman's previous scarred protagonists." On the Track: A Guide to Contemporary Film Scoring author Fred Karlin agreed that the song "gives Jessie's statement not only a specific emotionality, but also a universal one." Daly described "When She Loved Me" as the "weepiest moment" in the Toy Story trilogy, while Michael Mallory of the Los Angeles Times believes that both the song "encompasses the film's key message". By exploring the doll's character, film critic Roger Ebert wrote that the song proves that Jessie "does get the blues", despite her "spunky and liberated" personality. Contributors to the book Toy Story: How Pixar Reinvented the Animated Feature found "When She Loved Me" to be the "tragic inverse" of the series' theme song "You've Got a Friend in Me" due to its melancholy tone and outlook. Set nearly in the center of the original Toy Story trilogy, GamesRadar+ contributor Simon Kinnear identified the scene as "the point where the series truly grows up, shifting from a tale of childhood imagination to a mature reflection on growing up." The Nashville Scene opined that although "The scene is shot from a toy's point of view ... the primal fear it expresses--of fading from a child's memory as he or she grows older--is only too parental." Similar, Consequence of Sound contributor Allison Shoemaker wrote "The sequence manages to convey not only the ache of being left behind by someone you love, but the inevitable tragedy of growing up (and getting old). We all leave our childish things behind."

Music and lyrics
"When She Loved Me" is a pop song with light country influences that lasts a duration of three minutes and five seconds. Written in the key of F major, "When She Loved Me" is performed "tenderly" and "very freely" at a tempo of 75 beats per minute. A piano ballad, the song uses simple background accompaniment. Its melody has been described as "sad" and "aching". Sean Daly of the Tampa Bay Times described the ballad as a song that "captures the beauty of growing up and, for parents, the beauty of letting go". Newman himself described the song as a "slow ... and sort of grown-up emotional" track about the difference between feeling loved and unloved. CD Universe compared the ballad to the works of composer Aaron Copland and singer Fats Domino. According to Ellen A. Kim of Hollywood.com, "When She Loved Me" is a simple, somber song that McLachlan performs with "aching wistfulness". Similarly, Mary Colurso of AL.com called the track a "wistful ballad". BBC Online observed that, unlike Newman's previous film compositions that use tempo to convey emotion, Newman instead enlists McLachlan "to sing the eternal ache of being abandoned". Ben Pobjie, a writer for Medium, observed that the singer's "silken Canadian pipes turn a desperately sad song into a real wrist-slitter," comparing it to Newman's own "I Will Go Sailing No More" from the first film. According to Brad Green of Urban Cinefile, the ballad is a lament about "platonic, unconditional and enchantingly innocent love", themes he believes are seldom explored in mainstream pop music.

The term "heartbreaking" is often used to describe the song; Arkansas Online deemed the track "bittersweet". Described as "a heart-wrenching lament about being left behind", the song's lyrics begin, "When somebody loved me, ev'rything was beautiful." McLachlan movingly sings the line "I was left alone. Still I waited for the day when she'd say I will always love you." Despite having been written about "that fragile bond between child and favorite toy", the song's lyrics are open to universal interpretations. Richard Walters, editor of the book The Singer's Musical Theatre Anthology - Teen's Edition: Tenor, believes that the song "takes on a different meaning" in the event that it is separated from the plot of the film and performed by a male vocalist. Thomas S. Hischak, author of The Disney Song Encyclopedia, wrote that "When she Loved Me" is a "heart-tugging torch song" about losing a friend as opposed to losing a romantic interest. However, Hischak said that the "simple but moving" song can also be interpreted as a love song out of context. On the Track: A Guide to Contemporary Film Scoring author Fred Karlin agreed that the ballad "works in the most general way to express emotions anyone can relate to", despite originally being a personal statement by one of the film's main characters. J.W. Pepper & Son described the ballad as a "tender love song". Film critic Peter Bradshaw, writing for The Irish Times, wrote that he only "realised that the song is a parable for the parents' fear of abandonment by their children who won't want to play with them when they grow up" after becoming a father himself.

Reception and recognition

"When She Loved Me" has garnered critical acclaim. The Los Angeles Times film critic Michael Mallory wrote that "only the stoniest of viewers will remain unaffected by [this] show-stopping moment". Mallory concluded, "there are Oscar winners out there who would be hard-challenged to match the performance in that scene". Agreeing that the song is a "showstopping moment", The Guardian film critic Peter Bradshaw deemed the ballad "a tear-jerker to be classed with the imprisonment of Dumbo's mom" in Disney's Dumbo (1941). Mark Caro, writing for the Chicago Tribune, warned audiences that they "may embarrass [themselves] choking back tears over the plight of a computer-animated piece of plastic" upon hearing "When She Loved Me". Barbara Vancheri of the Pittsburgh Post-Gazette called the song irresistible, while film critic Roger Ebert described the track as "winsome". A critic for The Guardian described the film's use of "When She Loved Me" as "a fabulous moment". Glen Chapman of Den of Geek described "When She Loved Me" as "rather beautiful". A writer for the Nashville Scene deemed the scene the film's "most affecting moment". While Steve Persall of the St. Petersburg Times crowned it "one of Randy Newman's finest love songs", ASCAP considers "When She Loved Me" to be among Newman's most "outstanding" film contributions. P. Nelson Reinsch of PopMatters wrote that the scene "starts out saccharine but becomes truly beautiful in its kitschy truth regarding the inexorable passage of childhood." In a retrospective analysis of Newman's music, Paste's Tim Grierson believes that, despite sounding "seeming[ly] mawkish", the elements of "piercing emotion" that the musician continues to incorporate into his film scores has prevented "When She Loved Me" from "drift[ing] into pure sap." Jim Lane of News Review called the singer's performance "sublime", in addition to deeming the track "the most heartbreaking song ever composed for a motion picture." Reviewing the film's special edition re-release in 2006, IGN's Todd Gilchrist wrote that he struggles to identify "other moments in movie history that evoke the same kind of involuntary but completely deserved tears as" "When She Loved Me", continuing that the song's "bittersweet combination of ebullient love and palpable loneliness makes me sad just thinking about it." The critic also appreciated Disney's decision to have McLachlan record it over Newman.

In November 1999, The Courier-Journal contributor Judith Egerton predicted that the song would be nominated for an Academy Award. In 2000, "When She Loved Me" was nominated for an Academy Award for Best Original Song at the 72nd Academy Awards, becoming Newman's 13th nomination in the category, and his second Academy Award-nominated song from the Toy Story film series. The song's nomination was considered to be unusual at the time because, unlike most animated films that had garnered Best Original Song nominations before it, Toy Story 2 is not a musical. Most critics were expecting Newman to finally win his first Academy Award for "When She Loved Me". LGBT magazine The Advocate joked that the song was "the first Oscar-nominated girl-girl love song", referring to the relationship between Jessie and Emily. Ultimately, the song lost to Phil Collins' "You'll Be in My Heart" from Disney's animated film Tarzan (1999). "When She Loved Me" had been nominated for a Golden Globe Award for Best Original Song, which it also lost to "You'll Be in My Heart". "When She Loved Me" went on to win the Grammy Award for Best Song Written for a Motion Picture, Television or Other Visual Media at the 43rd Grammy Awards in 2001. The song also won the Golden Satellite Award for Best Original Song at the 4th Golden Satellite Awards in 2000. GamesRadar+ ranked "When She Loved Me" the sixth greatest Pixar moment.

Actors Tom Hanks and Tim Allen, the voices of Sheriff Woody Pride and Buzz Lightyear, respectively, were moved to tears upon watching "When She Loved Me" for the first time, as Hanks  explained, "we ... were looking at each other going, 'That's some powerful stuff' - to be reduced to that and to a level of emotion like that on a cartoon about talking toys and their adventures, it's profound". Tim Grierson of Mel Magazine crowned "When She Loved Me" "an all-time great tearjerker". The Guardian's Dorian Lynskey believes that the song has "made more people cry than any other song [Newman has] written." Similarly, Sam Adams, a critic for The A. V. Club, joked that "There are two kinds of people: People who weep during the 'When She Loved Me' montage, and people who lie about it." Singer-songwriter Elvis Costello identified "When She Loved Me" as a song that continues to make him cry whenever he hears it.

Live performances and cover versions 
McLachlan and Newman performed "When She Loved Me" live at the 72nd Academy Awards in March 2000, where it had been nominated for an Academy Award for Best Original Song. The song has since been covered by several artists, many of whom tend to adjust the song's interpretation into that of a love song during their own renditions. Actor and singer Michael Crawford recorded the song for The Disney Album (2001). Newman himself recorded an abridged, instrumental version of "When She Loved Me" on piano for his album The Randy Newman Songbook, Vol. 1 (2003). PopMatters' Chris Ingalls called Newman's decision to include an instrumental version of the ballad on the album "a smart move" that "allows the listener to hear the sad, aching melody unadorned." The Seattle Weekly wrote that Newman's "spare piano treatment carries this midlevel weeper to a state of grace". In 2006, musician Steve Tyrell recorded the song for his cover album The Disney Standards, which Christopher Loudon of JazzTimes described as a "gorgeously reflective" rendition. Actress and singer Kerry Butler covered "When She Loved Me" for her Disney-themed album Faith, Trust and Pixie Dust (2008), one of the more contemporary-sounding selections on the album of Disney songs.

Actress and singer Bridgit Mendler covered the song for the compilation album Disneymania 7 (2010), to which Walt Disney Records had personality invited her to contribute. Although Mendler was allowed to choose the song she wanted to record, Disney recommended that she cover "When She Loved Me", which she found very beautiful and agreed to record immediately upon listening to it. Although the artist had heard the song before, she did not remember much about it or its film until re-listening to the track in its entirety. Her first professional recording independent from an acting project, Mendler opted to offer a more upbeat interpretation of the ballad by incorporating guitars into its arrangement while respecting McLachlan's original. To help her replicate the power and emotion of the song and its scene, the producers dimmed the lights during Mendler's recording session. The cover was released shortly before Toy Story 3. Jill Sheets, a writer for the teen magazine Relate Magazine, praised Mendler's vocal performance and called her rendition "stunning". British pop group Steps recorded a cover of "When She Loved Me" for their Christmas album Light Up the World (2012). While Jeremy Williams-Chalmers of The Yorkshire Times praised the "unquestionable dexterity" of the three female singers' vocals, he found that the track "hardly fits with either the group's signature sound or the album's implicit Christmas joviality." Singer Jane Monheit recorded "When She Loved Me" for her album The Heart of the Matter (2013).

Stage actress and singer Samantha Barks covered the ballad on her self-titled debut studio album in 2016, renaming it "When He Loved Me". She promoted it with live performances at Feinstein's/54 Below in support of the album, with Suzanna Bowling of the Times Square Chronicles writing that her "emotions poured forth" with her rendition. Mexican music group Belanova released a Spanish cover of the song in 2016, entitled "Cuando Ella Me Amaba". Their version was included on the compilation album We Love Disney (Latino). Describing their rendition as "more heartbreaking" than the original, AXS contributor Lucas Villa observed that the group's "signature electro-pop sound" has been replaced with more acoustic instruments to emphasize front woman Denisse Guerrero's voice, which Villa felt "beautifully reflects the pain and pining in Jessie's sad story", concluding, "The emotion translates well with Belanova's haunting rendition." The song was covered by Japanese-Canadian band Monkey Majik in 2017 for the Japanese Disney cover compilation, "Thank You Disney". In 2019, contestant Walker Burroughs performed "When She Loved Me" live on a Disney-themed episode of the reality television competition American Idol, accompanying himself on piano. The performance was well-received by all three judges, with Katy Perry saying "You really transported me into a different time and place" and Lionel Richie calling it "as close to a perfect performance that I can ever think of.” Billboard's Robbie Daw dubbed it "the first perfect performance of the night." Burroughs ultimately advanced to the top eight of the competition following his performance.

The King's Singers covered the song using an arrangement by Philip Lawson. It was released in 2019 and featured on their album Love Songs.

On their 2020 album The Corner of Broadway and Main Street, Volume 2, a cappella ensemble Voctave performs an arrangement with singer Liz Callaway as a guest soloist.

Impact and legacy 
NewNowNext ranked "When She Loved Me" the second greatest song of McLachlan's career, crediting its Academy Award nomination to her "heartfelt interpretation". The song's sad tone has frequently drawn comparisons to McLachlan's television commercials for the American Society for the Prevention of Cruelty to Animals (ASPCA). Ranking "When She Loved Me" first on their "Definitive Ranking of the Saddest Pixar Moments", CollegeHumor's Willie Muse joked that McLachlan used "When She Loved Me" to make listeners cry "Long before she was singing background vocals for images of dogs being abused". Uproxx identified "When She Loved Me" as one of Pixar's "Moments ... Guaranteed To Make You Weep", about which author Josh Kurp wrote embodies "the thought and mindfulness ... put into Toy Story 2", calling it "almost as sad as Sarah McLachlan's ASPCA commercial." Ranking the montage the 7th of "17 Disney Moments That Never Fail to Make You Sob", Jenna Mullins of E! News also likened the scene to the singer's ASPCA commercials. Similarly, John Boone of Entertainment Tonight, while ranking "When She Loved Me" Pixar's fourth most tear-jerking moment, joked, "Between this and those adoption commercials, WHAT is your problem, Sarah McLachlan?! Do you WANT us to cry?" Consequence of Sound's Allison Shoemaker believes the ballad is among Pixar's "most potent" scenes "that punches you in the gut", calling it one of Newman's "biggest heartbreakers" before jokingly concluding, "Sarah McLachlan's vocal performance does all the things you remember from those awful animal abuse commercials."

"When She Loved Me" is considered to be one of the most tearful moments in Disney and Pixar's films. HelloGiggles contributor Stephanie Ashe included "When She Loved Me" among "The most emotional moments" from the Toy Story franchise. Digital Spy ranked the song the 10th most heartbreaking Pixar moment. In a retrospective review for The Irish Times, Bradshaw dubbed the song "the single most devastatingly sad moment in any kids' film". Including it among 10 "film soundtrack moments that'll have you crying in your popcorn", BBC Online called the ballad "the most heartbreaking story in the world" while writing that McLachlan's performance "left a generation of children looking to their parents and asking: "Mummy, why are you sad?" In 2015, Paste ranked "When She Loved Me" the 27th "Saddest Songs of All Time", with contributor Bonnie Stiernberg writing, "Everyone always talks about how Toy Story 3 destroyed them emotionally ... but the Toy Story scene that consistently breaks me up is the one from Toy Story 2 when Sarah McLachlan sings this Randy Newman song about a toy getting abandoned by her owner as she grows up." HuffPost credits the song with establishing "the foundation for the emotionally tough territory that Pixar would continue to mine in its subsequent efforts." Sky TV wrote that "When She Loved Me" "tugs heart-strings on a level not reached again until" Pixar's Up (2009). In review of Toy Story 3 (2010), Matt Goldberg of Collider felt that the sequel was slightly inferior to Toy Story 2 due to lacking "a moment of melancholy" like "When She Loved Me".

Awards and nominations

References

1990s ballads
Songs from Toy Story
1999 singles
1999 songs
Pop ballads
Bridgit Mendler songs
Sarah McLachlan songs
Grammy Award for Best Song Written for Visual Media
Songs about friendship
Songs about heartache
Torch songs
Songs written by Randy Newman
Walt Disney Records singles